A discography of the multi-instrumentalist Yusef Lateef (1920–2013).

Discography

As leader/co-leader

As sideman 

With Cannonball Adderley
 1962: The Cannonball Adderley Sextet in New York (Riverside, 1962)
 1962: Cannonball in Europe! (Capitol, 1962)
 1962: Jazz Workshop Revisited (Riverside, 1962)
 1963 Nippon Soul (Riverside, 1964) – live
 1963 Autumn Leaves (Riverside, 1975) – live
 1962-63 The Sextet (Milestone, 1982)

With Curtis Fuller
 1960: Images of Curtis Fuller (Savoy, 1960)
 1960: Boss of the Soul-Stream Trombone (Warwick, 1961)

With Charles Mingus
 1960: Pre-Bird (Mercury, 1961) – reissued as Mingus Revisited (Limelight)
 1960: Jazz Makers (Mercury, 1963)

With others
 Nat Adderley, That's Right! (Riverside, 1960)
 Ernestine Anderson, My Kinda Swing (Mercury, 1961) – rec. 1960
 Art Blakey, The African Beat (Blue Note, 1962)
 Donald Byrd, Byrd Jazz (Transition, 1956) – live rec. 1955. aka First Flight (Delmark) 
 Paul Chambers, 1st Bassman (Vee Jay, 1960)
 Art Farmer, Something You Got (CTI, 1977)
 Dizzy Gillespie, The Complete RCA Victor Recordings (Bluebird, 1995) – compilation
 Grant Green, Grantstand  (Blue Note, 1962) – rec. 1961
 Slide Hampton, Drum Suite (Epic, 1964) – rec. 1962
 Louis Hayes, Louis Hayes (Vee-Jay, 1960) – re-issued as Contemplation (1974) under Lateef's name
 Les McCann, Invitation to Openness (Atlantic, 1972) – rec. 1971
 Don McLean, Homeless Brother (United Artists, 1974)
 Sonny Red, Breezing (Jazzland, 1960)
 Leon Redbone, Double Time (Warner Bros., 1977)
 A. K. Salim, Afro-Soul/Drum Orgy (Prestige, 1965) – rec. 1964
 Clark Terry, Color Changes (Candid, 1961) – rec. 1960
 Doug Watkins, Soulnik (New Jazz, 1960)
 Randy Weston, Uhuru Afrika (Roulette, 1961) – rec. 1960
 Various Artists, Jazz Is Busting Out All Over (Savoy, 1957)

References

External links
Yusef Lateef's's discography

Jazz discographies